The Alisport Silent 2 Electro is an Italian mid-wing, single-seat motor glider, designed and produced by Alisport of Cremella and provided as a complete ready-to-fly aircraft. The aircraft was introduced at the Aero show held in Friedrichshafen in 2011.

Design and development
The Silent 2 Electro was derived from the Alisport Silent 2 Targa and differs primarily in having the front electric sustainer with its nose-mounted electric motor and propeller and associated batteries and controllers. It was originally called the Silent Targa E.

The aircraft is made from composites and features a T-tail. The wing skins are made from a composite sandwich built over pultruded carbon fibre spars. The bubble canopy tips up for access and has a built-in vent. The landing gear consists of a retractable main monowheel gear, a fixed (or optionally steerable) tail wheel and faired polymer wing tip wheels. The  electric motor is powered by two lithium polymer battery packs mounted near the aircraft's center of gravity, totalling a capacity of 4.3 kWh and weighing 15.5 kg (34.2 lbs). The nose-mounted propeller folds alongside the aircraft's nose when not powered to reduce drag and self-deploys when power is applied. The propeller mounting location eliminates the need for a retractable pylon and allows instant restarts of the engine without preparation, at any time in flight.

Specifications (Silent 2 Electro)

See also

References

External links

2010s Italian sailplanes
Alisport aircraft